The Friedrichshafen FF.60 was a German experimental floatplane produced by Flugzeugbau Friedrichshafen.

Development and design
The FF.60 was an experimental large triplane floatplane, powered by four Mercedes D.III engines. Its first flight took place in November 1918, only shortly before the Armistice that ended all further development. Only one was built.

Specifications (FF.60)

See also

References

Bibliography

Further reading

1910s German experimental aircraft
Triplanes
Floatplanes
FF.60
Four-engined tractor aircraft
Four-engined piston aircraft
Aircraft first flown in 1918